Kroenke (from ) is a surname. Notable people with the surname include:

 Ann Walton Kroenke (born 1948), American billionaire
 Bernard B. Kroenke (born 1898), American politician from Wisconsin
 Josh Kroenke (born 1980), American heir and entrepreneur
 June Kroenke, American inventor
 Stan Kroenke (born 1947), American entrepreneur
 Zach Kroenke (born 1984), American baseball player

See also
 Herbert Kronke (born 1950), German scientist

Germanic-language surnames